This is a ranking of Indian movies by highest domestic net collection, which includes films in the Hindi language, based on the conservative global box office estimates as reported by industry sources. However, there is no official tracking of figures, and sources publishing data are frequently pressured to increase their estimates.

Indian films have been screened in markets around the world since the early 20th century. , there are markets in over 90 countries where films from India are screened. During the first decade of the 21st century, there was a steady rise in the ticket price, a tripling in the number of theaters and an increase in the number of prints of a film being released, which led to a large increase in box office collections for major films.

The figures listed below are not adjusted for inflation.

Domestic net figures

Original Hindi-language films
The following is a list of the top 100 films originally shot in Hindi language by domestic collection:

Hindi-language dubbed versions
The following is the list of top 10 Hindi-language dubbed versions by domestic collection:

Back in 2010 Robot was 1st film to cross 20cr mark. In 2015 Bahubali becomes 1st film to cross 100cr. In 2017 Baahubali 2: The Conclusion cross 500cr.

Highest domestic net collection by year 
The following list shows India's highest-domestic net collection of Hindi films by year.

See also 
100 Crore Club
1000 Crore Club
List of highest-grossing films in India
List of highest-grossing Hindi films
List of highest-grossing South Indian Films

References 

Highest domestic
Hindi